Intense Tropical Cyclone Enawo was the strongest tropical cyclone of the 2016–17 South-West Indian Ocean cyclone season. Enawo was the strongest tropical cyclone to strike Madagascar since Gafilo in 2004, killing 78 people and causing $400 million in damages. Forming as a moderate tropical storm on 3 March, Enawo initially drifted and intensified slowly. It strengthened into a tropical cyclone on 5 March and further an intense tropical cyclone on 6 March. Enawo made landfall over Sava Region on 7 March just after reaching peak intensity, and it emerged back into the Indian Ocean as a post-tropical depression late on 9 March, before dissipating two days later. The most severe impacts were seen in the districts of Antalaha and Maroantsetra.

Meteorological history

A monsoon trough started to persist west of Diego Garcia in late February 2017 as the Madden–Julian oscillation (MJO) over the Indian Ocean grew more noticeable. On 2 March, a zone of disturbed weather formed within the area, although it was initially difficult to define a clear centre; later, the Joint Typhoon Warning Center (JTWC) issued a Tropical Cyclone Formation Alert for the improving low-level structure and favourable environmental conditions. The JTWC also began to issue tropical cyclone warnings on Enawo. Since the afternoon, Enawo started to significantly slow down with the weakening of the tropical ridge that drove the track southwards. Due to easterly vertical wind shear, the centre was located in the eastern part of deep convection.

Enawo developed into a severe tropical storm at around 18:00 UTC on 4 March, displaying an impressive embedded centre pattern associated with extremely cold cloud tops. The JTWC indicated a system equivalent to Category 1 on the Saffir–Simpson scale at the same time. Météo-France upgraded Enawo to a tropical cyclone at 06:00 UTC on 5 March, after it resumed a west to west-southwest track steered by the mid-troposphere ridge south of Madagascar. Enawo formed a ragged eye soon afterward, thanks to favourable conditions of excellent outflow, weaker vertical wind shear, and warm sea surface temperatures; however, the strengthening phase was halted for a half of day owing to a possible eyewall replacement cycle. Enawo started to intensify again and developed a well-defined eye indicated by both of satellite and microwave imageries, prompting Météo-France upgrading the system to an intense tropical cyclone at 12:00 UTC based on the structural improvements.

Early on 7 March, cloud tops cooled again around the eye, despite the fluctuating eye definition. Soon after that, Enawo made landfall over the area between Antalaha and Sambava in Sava Region, Madagascar at around 09:30 UTC (12:30 EAT), becoming the strongest landfall to the country since Gafilo in 2004. The cyclone started to rapidly weaken due to land interaction with a cloud-filled eye and the warming cloud tops; the JTWC also issued a final warning later for the inland movement. After classified as an overland depression early on 8 March and moving further inland, it started to accelerated southwards the next day along the weakening mid-troposphere ridge on Madagascar, with deep convection rather far away from the ill-defined centre. Meanwhile, gale-force winds still maintained over the eastern coast throughout the inland period. Enawo emerged into the Indian Ocean late on 9 March and was considered as a post-tropical depression by Météo-France because of the asymmetric and shallow core. However, the JTWC started to issue a tropical cyclone warning on Enawo again due to a  warm anomaly at 10 km altitude. Despite a final warning from the JTWC again for winds below gale-force a half of day later, Météo-France indicated that Ex-Enawo strengthened again during its extratropical transition, according to data from ships. The system became fully extratropical soon afterward, before dissipating late on 11 March.

Preparations and impact

Madagascar

Accordingly, Meteo Madagascar issued a red alert for several regions expected to be impacted by the storm. The National Bureau of Risk and Disaster Management advised the evacuation of low-lying areas and the acquisition of supplies in advance of the storm. The Piroi regional center of the International Red Cross made preparations.

Enawo made landfall halfway between the towns of Sambava and Antalaha as an Intense Tropical Cyclone at approximately 09:30 UTC (12:30 a.m. local time) on 7 March. In the district of Maroantsetra, landslides and strong winds caused widespread infrastructural damage, which also rendered 500 people homeless. There, a landslide killed one adult and two children, in addition to injuring six others. The city of Antalaha was particularly hard hit, where the port became inaccessible and half the population was rendered homeless. Rice fields in Antalaha and Sambava districts were submerged after heavy rain and suffered severe losses. The Lohoko River burst its banks near Farahalana, inundating part of the town.

As of 17 March, 78 deaths have been reported across the country, with 18 other people reported missing. Total damages were estimated to be US$400 million, including $US207 million to the agricultural sector alone.

Réunion 

See also

Weather of 2016 and 2017
Tropical cyclones in 2016 and 2017
Cyclone Indlala
Cyclone Ivan
Cyclone Bingiza
Cyclone Giovanna
Cyclone Batsirai

References

External links

Best Track data of Enawo from Météo-France 
09S.ENAWO from the U.S. Naval Research Laboratory

2016–17 South-West Indian Ocean cyclone season
2017 in Madagascar
March 2017 events in Africa
Cyclones in Madagascar
Intense Tropical Cyclones
Enawo